Jan Larsen may refer to:

 Jan Larsen (footballer) (1945–1993), Danish football defender
 Jan Larsen (darts player) (born 1954), Danish darts player
 Jan Larsen (swimmer) (born 1967), Danish swimmer
 Jan Kjell Larsen (born 1983), Norwegian football goalkeeper
 Jan Martin Larsen (born 1938), Norwegian cartographer, orienteer and politician
 Jan-Erik Larsen (born 1963), Norwegian editor and politician